Albert Taylor Goodwyn (December 17, 1842 – July 1, 1931) was a U.S. Representative from Alabama.

Early life and military career
Born at Robinson Springs, Alabama, Goodwyn attended Robinson Springs Academy and South Carolina College at Columbia (now the University of South Carolina). During the Civil War, he enlisted in the Confederate Army and served until June 1865. He was mustered out at the close of the war as captain of a company of sharpshooters and was decorated with the Southern Cross of Honor.He graduated from the University of Virginia at Charlottesville, where he was a member of St. Anthony Hall, in 1867. He engaged in agricultural pursuits near Robinson Springs.

Political career
Goodwyn served as state inspector of convicts 1874–1880. He served as member of the Alabama House of Representatives in 1886 and 1887. He served in the Alabama Senate 1892–1896. He successfully contested as a Populist the election of James E. Cobb to the Fifty-fourth Congress and served from April 22, 1896, until March 3, 1897. He was an unsuccessful candidate for reelection in 1896 to the Fifty-fifth Congress.

Goodwyn was elected commander in chief of the United Confederate Veterans on May 8, 1928. He resumed agricultural pursuits near Robinson Springs, Alabama. He died while on a visit in Birmingham, Alabama, on July 1, 1931. He was interred in Oakwood Cemetery, Montgomery, Alabama.

References

External links
 Retrieved on 2009-05-07

1842 births
1931 deaths
People from Montgomery County, Alabama
People's Party members of the United States House of Representatives from Alabama
Members of the Alabama House of Representatives
Members of the United States House of Representatives from Alabama
Alabama state senators
Confederate States Army officers
People of Alabama in the American Civil War